Tutty Alawiyah (March 30, 1942 – May 4, 2016), sometimes spelled Tuty Alawiyah, was an Indonesian politician and women's rights advocate. She served as Minister of State for Women's Affairs from March 1998 to October 1999 during the administrations of both President Suharto and his successor, President B. J. Habibie.

Alawiyah, the daughter of an Islamic scholar named  Abdullah Syaffi'ie, was born in Jakarta on March 30, 1942. She graduated from Syarif Hidayatullah State Islamic University Jakarta, which had previously been known as Syarif Hidayatullah State Islamic Institute.

In March 1998, Tutty Alawiyah was appointed Minister of State for Women's Affairs during the waning days of the Suharto administration. She continued to serve as Minister for Women's Affairs under Suharto's successor, President B. J. Habibie until October 1999.

Alawiyah was the former President of the International Women’s Union, which has branches in approximately eighty countries. She was also an executive member of the Indonesian Ulema Council (MUI) and the Muslim Intellectuals Association (ICMI).

She later founded and served as the rector of Assyafiiyah Islamic University in Pondok Gede, Bekasi, West Java, a position she held until her death in May 2016.

Tutty Alawiyah died at Metropolitan Medical Center (MMC) in Kuningan, Jakarta, at 7.15 a.m. on May 4, 2016, following a two-week hospitalization.  Alawiyah was 74 years old. She was survived by five children and thirteen grandchildren. Her five children include Dailami Firdaus, a member of the Jakarta Regional Council.

See also
List of female cabinet ministers of Indonesia

References

1942 births
2016 deaths
20th-century Indonesian women politicians
20th-century Indonesian politicians
Government ministers of Indonesia
People from Bekasi
Syarif Hidayatullah State Islamic University Jakarta alumni
Women government ministers of Indonesia